The Braidy Industries Women's Tennis Classic (formerly known as the Our Lady of Bellefonte Hospital Tennis Classic) is a tournament for professional female tennis players played on outdoor hard courts. The event is classified as a $60,000 ITF Women's Circuit tournament and has been held in Ashland, United States, since 2004. The tournament was not held from 2009 to 2017 due to unsuitable courts.

Past finals

Singles

Doubles

External links 
 Official website
 ITF search

ITF Women's World Tennis Tour
Hard court tennis tournaments in the United States
Recurring sporting events established in 2004
Tennis in Kentucky